The Tonight Show Starring Jimmy Fallon is an American late-night talk show that airs weeknights at 11:35 pm Eastern/10:35 pm Central on NBC in the United States. The hour-long show has aired since February 17, 2014 and is hosted by actor, comedian and performer Jimmy Fallon, an alumnus of Saturday Night Live. Hip hop/neo soul band The Roots serve as the show's house band, and Steve Higgins as the show's announcer. A total of  episodes have aired. Roots drummer Questlove often announces the episode number just before Higgins introduces Fallon.

Episodes

2014

2015

2016

2017

2018

2019

2020

2021

2022

2023

See also
 List of The Tonight Show episodes

References

External links
 Lineups at Interbridge 

Lists of American non-fiction television series episodes
Lists of variety television series episodes
The Tonight Show Starring Jimmy Fallon